Claudis Ray James (November 7, 1943 – February 25, 2013) was a wide receiver and halfback in the National Football League (NFL).

Biography
James was born on November 7, 1943, in Columbia, Mississippi.
He was the youngest of 11 children of Paul and Dora James. After retiring from football, he founded the first Dixie Youth Baseball League in Columbia and worked for the Mississippi School Supply Company.  He was a member of Praise Baptist Church in Jackson, Mississippi. He and his wife Emma James were married for 44 years. He died on February 25, 2013, at the age of 69. At the time of his death from a long illness, James was one of over 4000 former NFL players involved in a lawsuit against the NFL over issues related to concussions.

Career
He played college football at Jackson State University.
James was drafted in the 14th round of the 1967 NFL Draft by the Green Bay Packers and played with the team for two seasons. While there, he was a member of the Super Bowl II champion Packers. On July 7, 1969, the Packers traded James to the Los Angeles Rams for an undisclosed draft choice, but the trade was voided later that month when James failed a physical exam with the Rams. The Packers then placed him on injured reserve.  He sat out the 1969 season because of a knee injury, and was released by the Packers on August 10, 1970.

See also

 List of Green Bay Packers players

References

1943 births
2013 deaths
American football halfbacks
American football wide receivers
Green Bay Packers players
Jackson State Tigers football players
People from Columbia, Mississippi
Players of American football from Mississippi